The 2013 KNVB Cup Final was a football match between AZ and PSV Eindhoven that took place on 9 May 2013 at De Kuip, Rotterdam. It was the final match of the 2012–13 KNVB Cup competition and the 95th Dutch Cup Final. 

AZ won the match 2–1 to defeat the defending champions from the previous season to earn their 5th and most recent KNVB Cup trophy.

Route to the final

Match

Details

References 

2013
2012–13 in Dutch football
AZ Alkmaar matches
PSV Eindhoven matches
May 2013 sports events in Europe
Sports competitions in Rotterdam
21st century in Rotterdam